Apteromicra parva is a wingless species of fly in the family Sciomyzidae from Nepal. It is the only described species in the genus Apteromicra.

References

Sciomyzidae
Insects described in 2004
Diptera of Asia
Endemic fauna of Nepal